Rancho Llano de Tesquisquita was a   Mexican land grant in present-day San Benito County and Santa Clara County, California given in 1835 by Governor José Castro to José María Sanchez.  The name means "flats of  Tesquisquita".  The grant extended between the Pajaro River and Tesquisquita Slough, south of present-day Gilroy.

History
Jose Maria Sanchez (1804–1852), came to California from Mexico in 1825 forming a partnership with Francisco Perez Pacheco, grantee of Rancho Ausaymas y San Felipe.  In 1840, Sanchez married Encarnacion Ortega (1824–1894), the daughter of Quentin Ortega and Vicenta Butron of Rancho San Ysidro.  The first rancho Sanchez bought was Rancho Las Animas from the widow of Mariano Castro in 1835.  Sanchez was granted Rancho Llano de Tesquisquita in 1835. In 1844 Sanchez bought Rancho Lomerias Muertas from Jose A. Castro.  With thousands of cattle, Sanchez made money selling hides and tallow, the only parts of the animal worth anything. Besides trading in hides, Sanchez began manufacturing soap from the tallow. San Felipe Lake, also called Upper Soap Lake, is a permanent lake on the upper reaches of the Pajaro River.

With the cession of California to the United States following the Mexican-American War, the 1848 Treaty of Guadalupe Hidalgo provided that the land grants would be honored.  As required by the Land Act of 1851, a claim for Rancho Llano de Tesquisquita was filed with the Public Land Commission in 1852, and the grant was patented to José María Sanchez in 1871.

Sanchez drowned in the Pajaro River on Christmas Eve, 1852, leaving his widow, Maria Encarnacion Ortega Sanchez, and five children(sisters: Vicenta; Refugia; Candelaria; Guadalupe and one brother, José Gregorio). Numerous people were interested in gaining control of the vast Sanchez estate. In 1853, Maria Encarnacion Ortega Sanchez married her attorney, Thomas B. Godden. Godden was killed in the explosion of the steamboat "Jenny Lind" en route from Alviso to San Francisco on April 11, 1853. Maria Encarnacion Ortega's two husbands had died within four months of each other. In 1853, Maria Encarnacion Ortega married Dr. Henry L. Sanford. Sanford was killed in 1855, and Maria Encarnacion Ortega married George W. Crane (1827–1868), who died of Measles in 1868.

In 1855, California jurist and Democratic politician David S. Terry took up the cause of the "Widow Sanchez" after it was found she  was being cheated by local authorities, including the sheriff, William Roach, who took her fortune under the guise of guardianship. After kidnapping Roach with the help of a local gunslinger named Anastacio Garcia, Terry and his allies held Roach in a jail cell in Stockton until he agreed to release the widow's gold. But Roach had bribed a guard to ride to Monterey and urge Roach's family to hide the gold. The treasure was hidden somewhere in Carmel Valley, California by Roach's brother-in-law, Jerry MacMahon. MacMahon was killed in a barroom brawl before he could reveal the location of the money.

In 1864, the Sanchez heirs started selling their share of the land to Henry Miller.  By 1867, Miller and Lux owned  of the Sanchez ranchos.

In 1871, and Maria Encarnacion Ortega married her fifth husband, Anastacio Alviso, who was shot and killed shortly after their marriage.

See also
Ranchos of California
List of Ranchos of California

References

Llano de Tesquisquita
Llano de Tesquisquita
Ranchos of Santa Clara County, California
1835 establishments in Alta California